Taylor Tirahardjo (born ) is an Australian individual rhythmic gymnast. She has represented Australia at international competitions.

She has competed at world championships, including at the 2011 World Rhythmic Gymnastics Championships.

References

External links
https://database.fig-gymnastics.com/public/gymnasts/biography/10542/true?backUrl=%2Fpublic%2Fresults%2Fdisplay%2F1862%3FidAgeCategory%3D6%26idCategory%3D77%23anchor_1912
http://www.zimbio.com/pictures/k52wYt1eJBW/Australian+Gymnastic+Championships+Rhythmic/gbBSjoPPj_B/Taylor+Tirahardjo

1995 births
Living people
Australian rhythmic gymnasts
Place of birth missing (living people)
Gymnasts at the 2010 Summer Youth Olympics